Joseph David Lykken (born June 17, 1957) is a theoretical physicist at the Fermi National Accelerator Laboratory. From July 1, 2014 to Sept 6, 2022 he was the Deputy Director  of Fermilab. He is currently leading the Fermilab Quantum Institute.

Background and education
Lykken received his Ph.D. in 1982 from M.I.T. He arrived at Fermilab in 1989, where he worked in the Fermilab Theory Division, and as a collaborator of the Compact Muon Solenoid (CMS) experiment at the CERN Large Hadron Collider.

He is the son of David T. Lykken, noted psychologist, behavioral geneticist, and twin researcher.

Research
In 1996 Lykken proposed "weak scale superstrings," which posited extra dimensions of space within the reach of particle colliders, such as the Fermilab Tevatron, and the CERN Large Hadron Collider. This, and related ideas will be subject to direct and indirect experimental tests in the coming years.

Professional activities
Lykken is a former member and subpanel chair of the High Energy Physics Advisory Panel, which advises the United States Department of Energy and the National Science Foundation. He was a Trustee of the Aspen Center for Physics in Aspen, Colorado. He is a Fellow of the American Physical Society (APS) and the American Association for the Advancement of Science (AAAS), and is former chair of the APS Division of Particles and Fields.

Selected publications
Lykken's publications are available on the INSPIRE-HEP Literature Database .

References

External links
Dr. Lykken's website at Fermilab
Physics of the Universe Summit
  "...Joe Lykken is a very smart guy..." Washington Post article 2008-04-11
 Nobel Honors Glimpse Into Universe's Design "We'd been talking about it for years" says Lykken
Scientific publications of Joseph Lykken on INSPIRE-HEP

1957 births
Living people
American string theorists
21st-century American physicists
American people of Norwegian descent
Massachusetts Institute of Technology alumni
Fellows of the American Physical Society
Fellows of the American Association for the Advancement of Science
People associated with CERN
People associated with Fermilab